Sonam Gyalchhen Sherpa  is a Nepalese politician. He is also member of Rastriya Sabha and was elected from 2022 Nepalese National Assembly election.

References

External links
सदस्यहरु

Living people
Nepalese politicians
Year of birth missing (living people)